Chondroscaphe is a genus of orchids native to southeastern Central America and northwestern South America.

Chondroscaphe amabilis (Schltr.) Senghas & G.Gerlach in F.R.R.Schlechter - Ecuador, Colombia
Chondroscaphe atrilinguis Dressler - Costa Rica, Panama
Chondroscaphe bicolor (Rolfe) Dressler - Costa Rica, Panama
Chondroscaphe chestertonii (Rchb.f.) Senghas & G.Gerlach in F.R.R.Schlechter - Ecuador, Colombia
Chondroscaphe dabeibaensis P.A.Harding - Colombia
Chondroscaphe eburnea (Dressler) Dressler - Panama
Chondroscaphe embreei (Dodson & Neudecker) Rungius - Ecuador, Colombia
Chondroscaphe escobariana (Dodson & Neudecker) Rungius - Colombia
Chondroscaphe flaveola (Linden & Rchb.f.) Senghas & G.Gerlach in F.R.R.Schlechter - Colombia, Venezuela, Peru
Chondroscaphe gentryi (Dodson & Neudecker) Rungius - Ecuador
Chondroscaphe merana (Dodson & Neudecker) Dressler - Ecuador
Chondroscaphe plicata (D.E.Benn. & Christenson) Dressler - Peru
Chondroscaphe venezuelana Pupulin & Dressler - Venezuela
Chondroscaphe yamilethae Pupulin - Costa Rica

See also 
 List of Orchidaceae genera

References

External links 

Zygopetalinae genera
Zygopetalinae